Edward Kenney may refer to:

Edward Aloysius Kenney (1884–1938), member of the United States House of Representatives from New Jersey
Edward F. Kenney Sr. (1921–2006), American professional baseball executive
Edward John Kenney (1924–2019), professor of Latin
Edward Tourtellotte Kenney (1888–1974), politician in British Columbia, Canada
Edward Patrick Kenney (1888–?), Australian World War I flying ace
Edward Kenney (cricketer) (1845–1916), English cricketer and educator
Ed Kenney (1933–2018), singer/actor

See also
Edward Kenny (1800–1891), Canadian politician
Edward Kenny, mayor of East Newark, New Jersey